Caserta is the capital of the province of Caserta in the Campania region of Italy.

Caserta may also refer to:
 Places
 Caserta (Eastville, Virginia), a historic plantation house
 Caserta railway station
 Palace of Caserta, a former royal residence in Caserta
 Portico di Caserta, a comune (municipality) in the Province of Caserta
 Province of Caserta, Campania, Italy
 Roman Catholic Diocese of Caserta
 People
 Prince Alfonso, Count of Caserta (1841-1934), Pretender to the throne of the Two Sicilies
 Antonello da Caserta (active late 14th and early 15th centuries), Italian composer
 Fabio Caserta (born 1978), Italian footballer 
 Philippus de Caserta (late 14th century), Italian music theorist
 Raffaelo Caserta (born 1972), Italian fencer who competed at the 1996 Summer Olympics
 Robert of Caserta (died 1183), Count of Caserta
 Other uses
 SS Caserta, an Italian ocean liner
 Surrender of Caserta, the 1945 formal surrender document of the German forces in Italy, signed at the Palace of Caserta

See also